Big Chicks is a gay bar and neighborhood restaurant that opened in 1986 in Uptown, Chicago. It serves a diverse group of LGBT people, straight people and people in the kink community. The owner of the establishment is Michelle Fire. The restaurant next door, Tweet, is also owned by Fire and provides food to Big Chicks.

Overview 
Big Chicks is owned by Michelle Fire and located in Uptown, Chicago. The name of the bar was inspired by an experience Fire had on a trip to India, where she was referred to as "Big Chick," by men in Bandra. Big Chicks opened on December 11, 1986. Prior to Fire purchasing the bar, it had been a veteran's bar and when Fire took over, she inherited the clients, their dogs and the original bartenders. Big Chicks has been open every day since first opening as of 2016. Over time, the bar has become an "informal gay community center" in Uptown. Fire welcomed everyone in the LGBT community, straight people and people in various kink communities. The bar also is known for its art, including works by Diane Arbus, Manuel Alvarez Bravo, Leon Golub, Tony Fitzpatrick, Lee Godie and Hollis Sigler. Fire also owns Tweet, the restaurant next door, and food from there can be ordered in the bar. 

In 2016, the bar was inducted into the Chicago LGBT Hall of Fame.

References

External links 
Official site

1986 establishments in Illinois
LGBT culture in Chicago
LGBT drinking establishments in the United States
Restaurants in Chicago